Joe Atlan (born July 23, 1989 in Málaga) is a Spanish Keyboardist, Composer, YouTube Partner, and Speaker. He has performed with several musicians such as Timo Tolkki and has shared the stage with other artists like Sungha Jung. Joe Atlan is also known for his academic writings and conferences about Music, Art, and Internet, including a TED talk. He has a YouTube channel where he frequently uploads videos and publishes his music for free.

Biography

He first played a keyboard at the early age of 5, but he didn't go back to the music until he met the Italian power metal band Rhapsody. Atlan has stated many times in interviews or answering to comments on his Facebook/YouTube page that he discovered the "true Art" with J. R. R. Tolkien and the "art in Music" for the first time with Rhapsody. Since that moment, when Joe Atlan was 16, he started to play and compose music on the piano.

In 2007, Atlan went to University of Navarra in Pamplona, where he studied Audiovisual Communication. He was seen often playing in charity/alumni concerts. During his studies at university, he showed interest for Film Scoring, and even though the degree was mostly about Cinema & TV production, he decided in his 2nd year that he would dedicate his life to Music. Atlan has composed the soundtrack of several short films and documentaries over the last few years, as well as the original music for a Spanish TV series.

In November 2009, Joe Atlan was asked to play with the guitarist and Stratovarius found member Timo Tolkki in his Guitar Beyond Infinity Seminar Tour 2009–2010. The contact was done by Tolkki's manager. Atlan has mentioned Tolkki as one of his greatest musical influences many times, being this tour an "incredible honor" for him.

On February 10, 2010, he collaborated in the production of the World Record's biggest Lipdub ever made until that date, with almost 400 people in a single Long take.

During his university time and afterwards, Joe Atlan showed a deep interest for the academic and philosophical aspects of Music and Art. He has always talked about the importance of "true music" and a "selfless and pure attitude" from the musician towards Art. Atlan has stated several times in interviews and social media that he is writing a book about Music, the importance of a pure art and the artist's attitude towards it. In 2010 he contacted John Petrucci, the guitarist from the Progressive Metal band Dream Theater, to ask him to participate in the project. Some months later, Joe Atlan said also that he talked to Michael Romeo, guitarist from Symphony X about the project. According to Atlan, both of them were interested in collaborating on the book.

On September 16, 2012, Joe Atlan was one of the winners chosen to participate in Youfest, an international entertainment Festival starring famous YouTube stars from all over the world, such as Paul Potts, Rick Astley or Sungha Jung. Atlan was chosen from an arrangement he did with piano and keyboards of the Star Wars soundtrack on YouTube.

In October 2012, Joe Atlan was called to play in a national TV talent show similar to America's Got Talent but in Spain He performed Chopin's Fantaisie-Impromptu.

In 2013, Joe Atlan was asked to give a TED Talk about Music in La Rioja. Atlan called the conference "Can Music tell a story?" and he did it entirely with piano music without saying a word, just some projected text on a screen. In the "talk", Joe Atlan exposed that what attracts humans to stories is not what they actually watch or read, but what they feel when they do that, the "ineffable", what "can't be described through words". On that basis, Atlan stated that Music can skip the intermediary speaking directly to the human soul, with the final answer to the title of the conference being: "Music can make you feel a story without telling it".

In 2016, Atlan performed at the opening ceremony for League of Legends All-Star Event in Palau St. Jordi, Barcelona.

YouTube Channel

In October 2010, Joe Atlan started uploading his music to YouTube. In just a few days, one of his piano songs received more than 100,000 views. Since that moment, Atlan has used YouTube as the main way to share his music, projects, and stay in touch with the fans. His videos are a display of musical experimentation, sometimes with a touch of humor, usually combining instruments and sounds with no particular Genre, or making original arrangements from movie soundtracks, such as The Hobbit, Star Wars, or Pirates of the Caribbean. Atlan tends to show virtuoso skills as an entertainment and way to practice, specially using his Roland AX-7 Keytar, which has become his signature instrument. He also shares his piano compositions there and publishes them for free. Joe Atlan's songs are usually instrumental piano tracks with an epic fantasy, oceanic and hopeful atmosphere. His work on YouTube is often featured in digital magazines and music-video websites. In 2013, Atlan was also contacted by the Dubbing and Voice actor who does the official Spanish voices of Morgan Freeman, Ian McKellen among others, to start a project combining Music and Poetry.

Equipment

Roland AX-7 Keytar
Kurzweil K2600X (88 keys)
Korg Karma
Casio Celviano AL-100R
Roland JV-1080

Personal life

Joe Atlan was born in Málaga, but he has always lived in Marbella, where he currently resides. He is the oldest of 6 brothers. Atlan has often said through his social media pages that he does Archery, Taekwondo and Volleyball in his free time.

Discography

Singles

The following list consists of Joe Atlan's piano singles available at his YouTube Channel.

"Sea Light" (2010)
"A Breeze Away" (2011)
"The Shoreline Pearl" (2011)
"Dawn Drops" (2011)
"Draw the Bright Side" (2011)
"Healing Sands" (2012)
"Seahorse's Little Wish" (2012)
"Arisen Spirit" (2012)
"Crystalline Voice" (2012)
"Star Wars Medley" (2012)
"Pirates of the Caribbean Medley" (2012)
"River's Ending" (2012)
"Facing the Storm with Optimism" (2012)
"Song of the Lonely Mountains (from The Hobbit) (2012)"
"Musical Poem: Lagrima" (2013)

See also

University of Navarra
Dream Theater
Timo Tolkki
TED
YouTube
List of keytarists

References

External links
Joe Atlan's YouTube Channel
Website & Blog

1989 births
Living people
Spanish pianists
21st-century pianists